The 2013–14 season is AaB's 31st consecutive season in the top flight of Danish football, 24th consecutive season in the Danish Superliga, and 128th year in existence as a football club. AaB will participate in the Europa League this season, coming in 5th place in the 2012–13 Danish Superliga. The club had the most successful season in its history, winning the Danish Superliga for a fourth time and the Danish Cup for a third time, therefore becoming the fifth Danish club to complete the "Double".

Month by Month review

Club

Coaching staff 

{| class="wikitable"
|-
!Position
!Staff
|-
|Head Coach|| Kent Nielsen
|-
|Assistant coach|| Allan Kuhn
|-
|Development Manager – AaB Fodbold|| Poul Erik Andreasen
|-
|Goalkeeping coach|| Poul Buus
|-
|Team Leader|| Ernst Damborg
|-
|Doctor|| Søren Kaalund
|-
|Physiotherapist|| Morten Skjoldager
|-
|Physical trainer|| Ashley Tootle
|-
|Sports Psychology consultant|| Martin Langagergaard
|-
|U/19 League coach|| Jacob Friis
|-
|U/17 League coach|| Lars Knudsen
|-

Other information 

|-

First team squad 

As of 18 May 2014 

Source: AaB Fodbold website

Transfers and loans

In

Summer

Winter

Out

Summer

Winter

Loan in

Loan out

Overall transfer activity

Spending 

Summer:  £90,000

Winter:  £0

Total:  £90,000

Income 

Summer:  £1,280,000

Winter:  £300,000

Total:  £1,580,000

Expenditure 

Summer:  £1,190,000

Winter:  £300,000

Total:  £1,490,000

Friendlies

Pre-season

Mid-season

Post-season

Competitions

Competition record

Danish Superliga

League table

Results summary

Results by round

Matches

Danish Cup

UEFA Europa League

Qualifying phase and play-off round

Second qualifying round

Statistics

Appearances 

This includes all competitive matches. The list is sorted by shirt number when total appearances are equal.

Goalscorers 

This includes all competitive matches. The list is sorted by shirt number when total goals are equal.

Assists 

This includes all competitive matches. The list is sorted by shirt number when total assists are equal.

Clean sheets 

This includes all competitive matches. The list is sorted by shirt number when total clean sheets are equal.

Disciplinary record 

This includes all competitive matches. The list is sorted by shirt number when total cards are equal.

Summary

Awards

Player

Team

References 

2013-14
Danish football clubs 2013–14 season
2013–14 UEFA Europa League participants seasons